This is a list of diplomatic missions in Bahrain. The capital, Manama, hosts 38 embassies.

Embassies in Manama

Consulate General in Manama

Other missions in Manama 
 (Representative Office)
 (Taipei Trade Office in the Kingdom of Bahrain)

Non-resident embassies 

Resident in Abu Dhabi, United Arab Emirates:

 

 

Resident in Kuwait City, Kuwait:

 

Resident in Riyadh, Saudi Arabia:

 

Resident in Cairo, Egypt:

 
 
 
 
 

Resident elsewhere:
 
 (Rome)
 (Rome)

Embassy to open

Former Embassy

See also 
 Visa requirements for Bahraini citizens

References 
 Accredited missions in the Kingdom

Bahrain
Diplomatic missions